Olaf Frederik Stuger (born 3 May 1969) is a Dutch politician and Member of the European Parliament (MEP) from the Netherlands. He represents the Party for Freedom, part of the Europe of Nations and Freedom.

He was a member of the House of Representatives for the Pim Fortuyn List (Lijst Pim Fortuyn) from May 2002 till January 2003, and again from September to November 2006 to replace Gerard van As.

For the Dutch general election of 2006 he was party leader for the Pim Fortuyn List, which was then using the name List Five Fortuyn (Lijst Vijf Fortuyn).

Stuger studied public administration at Leiden University.

At the 2014 European Parliament election he was elected as a Member of the European Parliament (MEP) for the Party for Freedom and sat with the Europe of Nations and Freedom.

References 
  Parlement.com biography

1969 births
Living people
Dutch businesspeople
Dutch civil servants
Dutch management consultants
Leiden University alumni
Members of the House of Representatives (Netherlands)
People from Driebergen-Rijsenburg
Pim Fortuyn List politicians
Salespeople
MEPs for the Netherlands 2014–2019
Party for Freedom MEPs